Rajasthan Royals (RR) is a franchise cricket team based in Jaipur, India, and is one of the teams participating in the Indian Premier League (IPL). It played its first Twenty20 match in the first season of the IPL against the Delhi Daredevils. It later topped the group stage in that season, and won the final against the Chennai Super Kings to become the first winner of the IPL. It also reached the playoffs in the 2013 IPL. The team's performance in the 2008 and the 2013 season resulted in its qualification for the 2008 and the 2013 Champions League Twenty20 (CLT20), however the 2008 edition was cancelled due to the 2008 Mumbai attacks. The RR reached the finals in the 2013 CLT20, but lost the match to Mumbai Indians. Seventy-three players have played for RR, of whom Shane Watson has played the most matches.

Shane Watson is the only player to lead most runs, most wickets, highest score, highest batting average, most sixes, most matches for a team. Also the only player to win man of the tournament IPL twice. The best bowling average is Lee Carseldine's 6.00, though among bowlers who have bowled more than 20 overs, Sohail Tanvir has the best average: 11.44. Tanvir also has the best bowling figures in an innings: he claimed six wickets against Chennai Super Kings in a 2008 match, while conceding 14 runs. Mahesh Rawat has taken the most catches as wicket-keeper for RR, with 15, while Naman Ojha has made the highest number of stumpings: 7; Dishant Yagnik has made the most dismissals as wicket-keeper for RR with 18. Rahane has claimed the highest number of catches among fielders, with 28.

The first list includes all players who have played at least one match for RR and is initially listed alphabetically by their last name. The second list comprises all those players who have captained the team in at least one match, arranged in the order of the first match as captain. Many players have also represented other teams of the IPL, but only the records of their games for RR are given.

Key

Players

Captains

See also
List of Indian Premier League centuries
List of Indian Premier League records and statistics

Notes

Footnotes

References

External links
Official website of Rajasthan Royals 

Rajasthan Royals
Cricket